TKS may refer to:

Places
Turks and Caicos Islands, the country's ISO 3166-1 alpha-3-code
TKS, IATA code for Tokushima Airport, an airport serving Tokushima, Japan

Vehicles and transportation
TKS, Polish tankettes during the Second World War
TKS spacecraft, Soviet spacecraft
TKS Ice Protection system, fluid-based airborne ice protection system
TKS (company), the company producing the TKS ice protection system

Other uses
Taijin kyofusho syndromes, a Japanese  form of social phobia
3,5,7-Trioxododecanoyl-CoA synthase, an enzyme
The King's School, Parramatta, a private school situated in Western Sydney
The TESS-Keck Survey, an exoplanet search project

See also

 
 TK (disambiguation), for the singular of TKs